The F.B.I. is an American police television series created by Quinn Martin and Philip Saltzman for ABC and co-produced with Warner Bros. Television, with sponsorship from the Ford Motor Company, Alcoa and American Tobacco Company (Tareyton and Pall Mall brands) in the first season. Ford sponsored the show alone for subsequent seasons. The series was broadcast on ABC from 1965 until its end in 1974. Starring Efrem Zimbalist, Jr., Philip Abbott and William Reynolds, the series, consisting of nine seasons and 241 episodes, chronicles a group of FBI agents trying to defend the US government from unidentified threats. For the entirety of its run, it was broadcast on Sunday nights.

Synopsis
Produced by Quinn Martin and based in part on concepts from the 1959 Warner Bros. theatrical film The FBI Story, the series was based on actual FBI cases, with fictitious main characters carrying the stories. Efrem Zimbalist Jr. played Inspector Lewis Erskine, a widower whose wife had been killed in an ambush meant for him. Philip Abbott played Arthur Ward, assistant director to FBI Director J. Edgar Hoover. Although Hoover served as series consultant until his death in 1972, he never appeared in the series.

Stephen Brooks played Inspector Erskine's assistant, Special Agent Jim Rhodes, for the first two seasons. Lynn Loring played Inspector Erskine's daughter and Rhodes' love interest, Barbara, in the twelve episodes of the show's first season. Although the couple was soon engaged on the show, that romantic angle was soon dropped.

In 1967, Brooks was replaced by William Reynolds, who played Special Agent Tom Colby until 1973. The series would enjoy its highest ratings during this time, peaking at No. 10 in the 1970–1971 season. For the final season, Shelly Novack played Special Agent Chris Daniels.

Some episodes ended with a "most wanted" segment hosted by Zimbalist, noting the FBI's most wanted criminals of the day, decades before the Fox Network aired America's Most Wanted. The most famous instance was in the April 21, 1968, episode, when Zimbalist asked for information about fugitive James Earl Ray, who was being hunted for the assassination of Martin Luther King Jr.

The series aired on ABC at 8 p.m. Sunday from 1965 to 1973, when it was moved up to 7:30 p.m. for the final season. The series was a co-production of Quinn Martin Productions and Warner Bros. Television, as Warner Bros. held the television and theatrical rights to any project based on The FBI Story. It was the longest-running of all of Quinn Martin's television series, airing nine seasons.

Background

Every detail of every episode of the series was carefully vetted by F.B.I. second-in-command Clyde Tolson. Actors playing F.B.I. agents, and other participants, were given background checks to guarantee that no "criminals, subversives, or Communists" were associated with the show. The premiere episode of the first season, "The Monster," about a handsome serial killer who strangled women with their own hair, so shocked Tolson that he recommended the show be cancelled. J. Edgar Hoover attempted to cancel the show on at least seven other occasions. Upon Tolson's direction, the violence in the show was severely curtailed in the final three seasons.

Cast
Efrem Zimbalist Jr. as Inspector Lewis Erskine
Philip Abbott as Arthur Ward
William Reynolds as Special Agent Tom Colby
Lynn Loring as Barbara Erskine (season 1)
Stephen Brooks as Special Agent Jim Rhodes (seasons 1 and 2)
Shelly Novack as Special Agent Chris Daniels (season 9)
Dean Harens as Special Agent Bryan Durant
Lew Brown as Special Agent Allen Bennett
Anthony Eisley as Special Agent Chet Randolph
Hank Brandt as Special Agent William Converse (recurring role)

Episodes

Nielsen ratings
Season 1: Not in Top 30
Season 2: #29, 20.2
Season 3: #22, 21.2
Season 4: #18, 21.7
Season 5: #24, 20.6
Season 6: #10, 23.0
Season 7: #17, 22.4
Season 8: #29, 19.2
Season 9: Not in Top 30

Home media

Warner Bros. (under the Warner Home Video label) has released all nine seasons of The F.B.I. on DVD in region 1 via their Warner Archive Collection. These are Manufacture-on-Demand (MOD) releases and are available through Warner's online store and Amazon.com. The ninth and final season was released on September 23, 2014.

Similar series
 An updated and revamped version of the series, Today's FBI, executive produced by David Gerber for Columbia Pictures Television, aired on ABC from October 1981 through April 1982 in the same Sunday 8 p.m. time slot as its predecessor.
 A remake of the original series, produced by Ron Howard's Imagine Entertainment for Fox, was set for air in Fall 2008, but it didn't materialise.
 In September 2018, a similar series, titled FBI, debuted on CBS; this series was co-created by Dick Wolf and Craig Turk for Universal Television. Unlike The F.B.I. and  Today's FBI, however, the cases presented are largely fictional. Would be followed by two spinoffs: FBI: Most Wanted and FBI: International.

Popular culture 
 The Lupin the Third Part II episode Diamonds Shining in the Robot's Eye parodies The F.B.I..
 In 1971, MAD Magazine published a satire titled The F.I.B. 
 The series was featured in Quentin Tarantino's ninth film Once Upon a Time in Hollywood, wherein Rick Dalton, the film's main character, portrayed the villain in an altered version of "All the Streets Are Silent" (air date November 28, 1965), the eleventh episode of the first season of The F.B.I. Rick Dalton replaced the character played by Burt Reynolds in the original episode.

References

External links

The FBI Open and Close of program
The FBI Tribute Site

1960s American crime television series
1970s American crime television series
American Broadcasting Company original programming
Television series by Warner Bros. Television Studios
1965 American television series debuts
1974 American television series endings
English-language television shows
Television series about the Federal Bureau of Investigation
Television shows set in California
Espionage television series